Dark Heart is a British television crime drama series, based on the Will Wagstaffe novels by writer Adam Creed, that first broadcast on 9 November 2016. The series stars Tom Riley as DI Will Wagstaffe, a police detective haunted by the unsolved double murder of his parents when he was just sixteen years old. A single feature-length pilot, based on the novel Suffer the Children, was written by Chris Lang and directed by Colin Teague. It first broadcast on ITV Encore on 9 November 2016. The initial pilot co-stars Kobna Holdbrook-Smith, Tom Brooke, Anjli Mohindra, Charlotte Riley and Miranda Raison.

Following strong audience reception, a series of six hour-long episodes was commissioned in December 2017, with filming taking place in Spring 2018. The series consists of four newly-written episodes alongside the pilot, which has been re-edited, with some scenes re-shot, to form the first two episodes of the series. Lang returned to pen the four new episodes; including two which were co-written by Ben Harris. Teague returned as director.

Jason Maza, Michele Austin, Alex Carter and Gregg Chillin joined the cast following the departures of Brooke and Holdbrook-Smith, who was unable to return to the series because of other filming commitments. Due to the closure of ITV Encore in March 2018, the series transmitted on ITV, alongside a number of other projects originally set for broadcast on Encore. The series began broadcasting on 31 October 2018, with episodes shown on Wednesdays and Thursdays at 9:00 pm.

Production
Tom Riley stated the intention of the pilot being re-shot to become the first two episodes of the series was to remove elements of violence and torture suited more to a "cable audience", and commented "we got the chance to look at it again to see what worked and what didn't work, or which way we wanted it to go. You don't really get that option. It was strange to go back, but at the same time, a luxury that you don't normally get."

Notable edits made include close-up shots of a murder victim's face being removed during a scene where his testicles are shown to have been inserted into his eyesockets; scenes involving dialogue between Staffe and Josie (Anjli Mohindra) where she is seen to "admire" him being removed; and several scenes involving Staffe and Sylvie (Miranda Raison), including having dinner and making love, being entirely re-shot. Notably, the "blurry" close-up filming style used in the pilot is also toned-down for the remainder of the series, following negative feedback from viewers.

Production filmed scenes at one of the beach chalets on Shellness Beach, Kent and also filmed a drone shot of a car travelling along Shellness Road, Kent.

Broadcast
The rebroadcasting of the pilot prompted an article in the Daily Express, detailing complaints from several viewers, who claimed that ITV's failure to bill the first two episodes as a repeat were "misleading".

Those who were unaware that the first two episodes were a recut of the pilot noted a considerable unexplained change come episode three, with a number of new cast members (Jason Maza, Michele Austin, Alex Carter and Gregg Chillin) appearing without explanation, and the unexplained aging of Will's nephew Harry (Joseph Teague), who appears to be of primary school age in the pilot, but suddenly looks considerably older and is seen to be attending high school.

Cast
 Tom Riley as Will "Staffe" Wagstaffe; Detective Inspector
 Anjli Mohindra as Josie Chancellor; Detective Constable
 Kobna Holdbrook-Smith as Dave Pulford; Detective Sergeant (Episodes 1—2)
 Tom Brooke as Rick Johnson; Detective Sergeant (Episodes 1—2)
 Jason Maza as Rob Mullan; Detective Sergeant (Episodes 3—6)
 Michele Austin as Annie Webb; Detective Constable (Episodes 3—6)
 Alex Carter as Ray Monk; Detective Constable (Episodes 3—6)
 Gregg Chillin as Luke Paul; forensic pathologist (Episodes 3—6)
 Charlotte Riley as Juliette Wagstaffe; Staffe's elder sister
 Miranda Raison as Sylvie; Staffe's girlfriend
 Joseph Teague as Harry Wagstaffe; Staffe's nephew
 Jonathan Harden as Grant Balden
 Edward Akrout as Paulo; Juliette's fiancé
 Christopher Fulford as Bob Jessop; ex-Detective Inspector (Episodes 1—2)

Episodes

Pilot (2016)

Series 1 (2018)

References

External links

2016 British television series debuts
2010s British crime drama television series
English-language television shows
ITV television dramas
Murder in television
Television series by ITV Studios
Television shows set in London